Utricularia chiribiquitensis is a small, probably annual, carnivorous plant that belongs to the genus Utricularia. It is endemic to Colombia and Venezuela. It was originally described and published by Alvaro Fernández-Pérez in 1964. The species epithet, chiribiquitensis, refers to the mountain range in Colombia where this species is found.

See also 
 List of Utricularia species

References 

Carnivorous plants of South America
Flora of Colombia
Flora of Venezuela
chiribiquitensis
Plants described in 1964